Listen to the Band is a box set compilation of recordings by the Monkees, issued by Rhino Records in 1991 to commemorate the group's 25th anniversary. The box set consisted of four CDs spanning the years 1966 to 1987, a 30-page LP-sized book featuring interviews with all four Monkees, as well as their songwriters and producers, and a full-color poster of Monkees memorabilia.

Most of the tracks were remixed from the original multitrack tapes. In most cases, these remixes are exclusive to this set.

Track listing

Disc 1

Disc 2

Disc 3

Disc 4

References

The Monkees compilation albums
1991 compilation albums
Rhino Records compilation albums